Il Dottor Faust (English: The Doctor Faustus) is a tragedy written in 2018 by the Italian poet Menotti Lerro. It is based on the mythical, German figure of Faust.

Critical reception
The book has been analyzed by Francesco D'Episcopo from Federico II University in the volume Menotti Lerro, Tra Drammaturgia e Narrativa (Genesi: 2019) and has been presented at the Museum of Archeology of Salerno in 2018 and in Vallo della Lucania in 2019.
According to D'Episcopo among innovations made from Lerro in terms of plot and new figures, it is important to stress the revolution to have, with this drama, a first version of an androgynous Mephistopheles.

References

Biobliography
Francesco D'Episcopo, Menotti Lerro, Tra Drammaturgia e Narrativa (Genesi: 2019), pp. 43-47. 
Sara Cudia, Donna Giovanna di Menotti Lerro. L'innovazione del mito (Zona: 2020), p. 45. 
Marcello Napoli, "Il Faust Barliario di Menotti Lerro", Il Mattino, 2018.

External links
Official page 
UNISA CATALOGUE
OPAC

Works based on the Faust legend
Tragedy plays